Wendy DeBoer is a member of the Nebraska Legislature from the 10th district. She was elected to the Nebraska Legislature's 10th district after Bob Krist announced that he would run for Governor of Nebraska.

Personal life
DeBoer was born on May 16, 1974, in Omaha, Nebraska.

Education
DeBoer Graduated from Burke High School in 1992. She had attended Hastings College and graduated in 1996, (with B.A. in economics and English) went to the University of Nebraska College of Law (J.D.) and graduated in 1999, attended University of Nebraska at Omaha (M.A. in English literature) and graduated in 2003, attended Lutheran School of Theology at Chicago (M.A. in theology) and graduated in 2008, and attended the Syracuse University (MPhil in religious studies) and graduated in 2015.

Nebraska Legislature
DeBoer was elected to the Nebraska Legislature's 10th district after Bob Krist announced that he would run for Governor of Nebraska. She defeated Matt Deaver in both the Primary and General election.

Electoral history

References

1974 births
21st-century American women politicians
21st-century American politicians
Living people
Hastings College alumni
University of Nebraska alumni
Lutheran School of Theology at Chicago alumni
Syracuse University alumni
Women state legislators in Nebraska
Democratic Party Nebraska state senators